John-Paul Himka (born May 18, 1949, in Detroit, Michigan) is an American-Canadian historian and retired professor of history of the University of Alberta in Edmonton. Himka received his BA in Byzantine-Slavonic Studies and Ph.D. in History from the University of Michigan in 1971 and 1977 respectively. The title of his Ph.D. dissertation was Polish and Ukrainian Socialism: Austria, 1867–1890. As a historian Himka was a Marxist in the 1970s–80s, but became influenced by postmodernism in the 1990s. In 2012 he defined his methodology in history as "eclectic".

Life
Himka is of mixed ethnic background, Ukrainian (on father's side) and Italian (on mother's). Initially, he wanted to become a Greek Catholic priest and studied at St. Basil Seminary in Stamford, Connecticut. However, due to the radicalization of his political views to the left by the end of the 1960s he did not pursue that vocation.

Career

Since 1977, he taught at University of Alberta, Department of History and Classics. He became full Professor in 1992 and retired from the university in 2014. Himka is the recipient of several awards and fellowships, most notably the Rutherford Award for Excellence in Undergraduate Teaching in 2006, the Philip Lawson Award for Excellence in Teaching, and the J. Gordin Kaplan Award for Research Excellence. He served as co-editor of the Encyclopedia of Ukraine for three volumes devoted to history.

Himka, who traveled to Ukraine to conduct research since 1976, began to work with academics at Lviv University's Department of History. Initially Himka focused on Galicia's social history in the 19th and 20th centuries. The 1988 1000th anniversary of the Christianization of Rus' kindled his interest in the history of the Greek Catholic Church and the influence of the church on the development of Ukrainian nationalism. In 2002 he researched  socialism in Habsburg Galicia, a formerly autonomous region in Western Ukraine, sacred culture of the Eastern Slavs (on iconography in particular) and the Holocaust in Ukraine. Since the late 1990s his contention with what he calls Ukrainian "nationalist historical myths" became subject of increasing, sometimes heated, debates both in Ukraine and Ukrainian Diaspora (especially in North America). Himka challenged the interpretation of Holodomor as a genocide and the view that Ukrainian nationalism and nationalists played no or almost no role in the Holocaust in Ukraine. He also opposed official glorification of such nationalistic heroes as Roman Shukhevych and Stepan Bandera in Ukraine during the presidency of Viktor Yushchenko.

In his 1996 article, Krakivski visti and the Jews, 1943: A Contribution to the History of Ukrainian-Jewish Relations during the Second World War, published in the Journal of Ukrainian Studies, based on earlier Ukrainian-language versions presented in 1991 in Kyiv and 1993 in Jerusalem at Ukrainian-Jewish relations conferences, Himka wrote that the history of Ukrainian-Jewish relations during WWII remained surprisingly underinvestigated. Himka cited Raul Hilberg's "monumental study", The Destruction of the European Jews as the source used by historians. In response to this lacuna, Himka presented his detailed study of the publishing of a series of antisemitic articles in 1943 in the "flagship of Ukrainian journalism under Nazi occupation," Krakov's daily newspaper Krakivs'ki Visti. The primary sources for his study included the articles as well as the records of the Krakivs'ki Visti maintained by Ukrainian-Canadian Michael Chomiak, who was born in Ukraine in the 1910s as Mykhailo Khomiak and changed his name to Michael Chomiak when he emigrated to Canada at the end of WWII. The Provincial Archives of Alberta acquired Chomiak's records in 1985 following Chomiak's death. He was the chief editor of Krakivs'ki Visti from 1940 to 1945. Himka is his son-in-law. Himka described how Krakivs'ki Visti "played an important and, generally, positive role in Ukrainian life," "serving as a buffer between the German occupation authorities and the population of the  Generalgouvernement." In response to a May 1943 order by the German press chief, the newspaper published antisemitic articles from May 25 through July which were received negatively by the Ukrainian intelligentsia in general.

Himka completed a series of three major studies on the history of Ukrainian Galicia in the 19th century. The first, Socialism in Galicia: the emergence of Polish social democracy and Ukrainian radicalism (1860–1890) was published in 1983. The second, Galician Villagers and the Ukrainian National Movement in the Nineteenth Century was published in 1988. The third, Religion and Nationality in Western Ukraine: The Greek Catholic Church and the Ruthenian National Movement in Galicia, 1867–1900, which is "devoted to the interrelations between church and state", was published in 1999. In a book review in the Harvard Ukrainian Studies, Larry Wolff described Religion and Nationality in Western Ukraine as a subtle, sophisticated and insightful account of an "important and profoundly complex historical problem." Wolff writes that Himka's research "makes the case for a contingent and evolutionary perspective on nationality in which several different forms and inflections of national identity jostle one another in cultural competition, enhanced or diminished by various historical forces, including religion, without any predetermined outcome." Himka, "engaged with the all-important issue of national identity, makes a brilliant contribution, not just to the history of Ukrainian nationality, but also to the general theoretical understanding of modern nationalism." Himka employs "concepts of nationality and nationalism developed by Ernest Gellner, E.J. Hobsbawm, and Miroslav Hroch. Himka observed that the "Greek Catholic case in Galicia" is "a stunningly transparent instance of how much agency and choice can be involved in the construction of nationality."

In his 2005 article, War Criminality: A Blank Spot in the Collective Memory of the Ukrainian Diaspora War Criminality he examined material that emerged from an important Ukrainian-Jewish relations conference held in 1983, that happened to be held on the 50th anniversary of the Soviet famine of 1932–33. as well as "current electronic media and recent years of The Ukrainian Weekly, supplemented with a retrospective sampling of articles from Svoboda." At the 1983 conference, Professor Yaroslav Bilinsky denied "a causal connection between alleged collaboration of Jewish-born Communists in the collectivization of agriculture and the Great Famine and any proven collaboration of Ukrainian-born extremists in the Holocaust."'

His 2009 book, Last Judgment Iconography in the Carpathians, was the result of ten years of research "throughout the region of the Carpathian Mountains, where he "found a distinctive and transnational blending of Gothic, Byzantine, and Novgorodian art."

In his chapter Ethnicity and the Reporting of Mass Murder: Krakivs′ki visti, the NKVD Murders of 1941, and the Vinnytsia Exhumation, Himka examined how the Krakivs'ki Visti, an "important [Ukrainian] nationalist newspaper" "reported on two cases of mass violence by the Soviets, the 1941 NKVD prisoner massacres and the 1943 Vinnytsia massacre. Himka wrote that Krakivs'ki Visti "ethnicized both perpetrators and victims, ascribing primarily Jewish identity to the former and depicting the latter as almost exclusively Ukrainian."

Personal life
John-Paul Himka is married to Chrystia Chomiak, the daughter of Michael Chomiak's (1905 – 1984), who was an editor of the Ukrainian antisemitic newspaper Krakivs'ki Visti. Himka learned of this only after Chomiak died in 1984. They have two children.

Awards 
He was awarded the 2001-2002 Killam Annual Professorship
 
 Antonovych prize (1988)
 Rutherford Award for Excellence in Undergraduate Teaching (2006)
 Philip Lawson Award for Excellence in Teaching 
 J. Gordin Kaplan Award for Research Excellence

Bibliography
Books
 Socialism in Galicia: The Emergence of Polish Social Democracy and Ukrainian Radicalism (1860–1890) (1983)
 Galician Villagers and the Ukrainian National Movement in the Nineteenth Century, Palgrave Macmillan (1988)
 Religion and Nationality in Western Ukraine: The Greek Catholic Church and the Ruthenian National Movement in Galicia, 1867–1900 (1999)
 Last Judgment Iconography in the Carpathians (2009)
  Ukrainian Nationalists and the Holocaust: OUN and UPA’s Participation in the Destruction of Ukrainian Jewry, 1941–1944 (2021)

Edited and co-edited volumes
(Assistant editor.) Rethinking Ukrainian History (1981)
 (Editor, translator and author of introduction.) Rosdolsky, Roman. Engels and the "Nonhistoric" Peoples: The National Question in the Revolution of 1848 (1986)
 Galicia and Bukovina: A Research Handbook about Western Ukraine, Late 19th and 20th Centuries (1990)
 Co-editor (with Hans-Joachim Torke). German-Ukrainian Relations in Historical Perspective (1994)
 Co-editor (with Andriy Zayarnyuk). Letters from Heaven: Popular Religion in Russia and Ukraine (2006)
 Co-editor (with Joanna Beata Michlic). Bringing the Dark Past to Light: The Reception of the Holocaust in Post-Communist Europe (2013)

References

External links
 https://web.archive.org/web/20160127032426/http://www.historyandclassics.ualberta.ca/People/EmeritiRetired/HimkaJohnPaul.aspx
  Іван-Павло Химка: «Я пережив багато методологічних мод» Historians.in.ua, 2 April 2012.

20th-century Canadian historians
Canadian male non-fiction writers
Living people
University of Michigan College of Literature, Science, and the Arts alumni
1949 births
American emigrants to Canada
Historians of Ukraine
Academic staff of the University of Alberta
21st-century Canadian historians
Historians from Alberta
Ukrainianists
Cultural historians
Historians of the Holocaust
Historians of Eastern Europe
Canadian Marxist historians
Postmodern writers
Historians of Austria
Scholars of nationalism
Historians of Hungary
Canadian art historians
Historians of Byzantine art
Austria-Hungary